David Blair (born September 25, 1975) is an American Paralympic athlete. He represented the United States at the 2016 Summer Paralympics held in Rio de Janeiro, Brazil and he won the gold medal in the men's discus throw F44 event. At this event, he also set a new world record of 64.11 m.

He finished in 4th place in the men's discus throw F64 event at the 2020 Summer Paralympics held in Tokyo, Japan.

References

External links 
 

Living people
1975 births
Place of birth missing (living people)
Athletes (track and field) at the 2016 Summer Paralympics
Athletes (track and field) at the 2020 Summer Paralympics
Medalists at the 2016 Summer Paralympics
Paralympic gold medalists for the United States
Paralympic medalists in athletics (track and field)
Paralympic track and field athletes of the United States
World record holders in Paralympic athletics
American male discus throwers
American male shot putters
Track and field athletes from Utah
Weber State Wildcats men's track and field athletes
People from Eagle Mountain, Utah
21st-century American people